The following people were educated at Westminster School in London, and are sometimes listed with OW (Old Westminster) after their name (collectively, OWW). There are over 900 Old Westminsters listed in the Oxford Dictionary of National Biography so these are necessarily a small sample:

15th century
John Hygdon (c. 1472–1532), first dean of Cardinal College Christ Church, Oxford

16th century
Richard Hakluyt (c. 1552–1616), travel writer
Thomas Braddock (1556–1607), clergyman and translator
William Alabaster (1567–1640), poet
Robert Bruce Cotton (1570–1631), antiquarian
Ben Jonson (1573–1637), poet and dramatist
Arthur Dee (1579–1651), physician
Richard Corbet (1582–1635), poet
Sir Richard Lane (1584–1650), Chief Baron of the Exchequer
Robert Herrick (1591–1674), poet
Charles Chauncy (1592–1672), President of Harvard 1654–72
Henry King (1592–1669), poet
George Herbert (1593–1633), public orator and poet

17th century
Jasper Mayne (1604–1672), dramatist
Thomas Randolph (1605–1635), poet and dramatist
Abraham Cowley (1618–1667), poet
Sir John Baber (1625–1704), physician to Charles II of England
Richard Lower (1631–1691), pioneering physician
John Dryden (1631–1700), poet and playwright
John Locke (1632–1704), philosopher
Sir Christopher Wren (1632–1723), architect, scientist and co-founder of the Royal Society
Robert Hooke (1635–1703), scientist and co-founder of the Royal Society
Thomas Gale (c. 1636–1702), classical scholar and antiquarian
Henry Aldrich (1647–1710), philosopher
George Jeffreys, 1st Baron Jeffreys of Wem (1648–1689), Lord Chief Justice of the Bloody Assize, Lord Chancellor (also ed. by Thomas Chaloner at Shrewsbury and attended St Paul's)
Humphrey Prideaux (1648–1724), Dean of Norwich
William Taswell (1652–1721), priest and witness to the Great Fire of London
Lancelot Blackburne (1658–1743), Archbishop of York
Henry Purcell (1659–1695), composer
Charles Montagu, 1st Earl of Halifax (1661–1715), creator of the Bank of England
James Hamilton, 6th Earl of Abercorn (1661–1734), Privy Counsellor
William King (1663–1712), poet
Matthew Prior (1664–1771), poet
Nicholas Rowe (1674–1718), Poet Laureate 1715
Richard Newton, (1676–1753), founder and principal of the first Hertford College, Oxford
William Pulteney, 1st Earl of Bath (1684–1764), Cabinet Minister
John Carteret, 2nd Earl Granville (1690–1763), statesman and Cabinet Minister
Thomas Pelham-Holles, 1st Duke of Newcastle-upon-Tyne (1693–1768), First Lord of the Treasury 1754–1756, Prime Minister
James Bramston (1694–1744), satirist
John Leveson-Gower, 1st Earl Gower (1694–1754), Lord Privy Seal
Henry Pelham (1696–1754), First Lord of the Treasury and Chancellor of the Exchequer 1743–1754, Prime Minister
John, Lord Hervey (1696–1743), statesman and writer
John Dyer (1699–1748), poet

18th century
Sir Thomas Clarke, Master of the Rolls
Charles Wesley (1707–1788), Methodist preacher and writer of over 6,000 hymns
William Beckford (1709–1770), politician, twice Lord Mayor of London
John Cleland (1709–1789), author of the first erotic novel
Sir John Eardley Wilmot (1709–1792), Chief Justice of the Common Pleas
Robert Hay Drummond (1711–1776), Archbishop of York
James Waldegrave, 2nd Earl Waldegrave (1715–1763), First Lord of the Treasury, Prime Minister for five days in 1757
Francis Lewis (1713–1803), signatory of the United States Declaration of Independence
General Thomas Gage (1721–1787), C in C North America, Governor of Massachusetts 1774
John Burgoyne (1723–1792), Lieutenant-General who surrendered British Army at Saratoga
Richard Howe, 1st Earl Howe (1726–1799), Admiral of the Fleet
Sir William Dolben, 3rd Baronet (1727–1814), MP and campaigner for the abolition of slavery
Charles Watson-Wentworth, 2nd Marquess of Rockingham (1730–1782), Prime Minister
William Cowper (1731–1800), poet and hymnodist
Henry Constantine Jennings (1731–1819), collector
Charles Churchill, George Colman the Elder, Bonnell Thornton and Robert Lloyd (1731–1764, 1732–1794, 1725–1768, and 1733–1764), satirists and poets; founders of the satirists' Nonsense Club
Warren Hastings (1732–1818), Governor-General of Bengal impeached but acquitted by Parliament
Nevil Maskelyne (1732–1811), Astronomer Royal
Richard Cumberland (1732–1811), dramatist
Welbore Ellis Agar (1735–1805), commissioner of HM Revenue and Customs and art collector
Augustus Henry Fitzroy, 3rd Duke of Grafton (1735–1811), Prime Minister
Charles Lennox, 3rd Duke of Richmond (1735–1806), reforming politician
John Horne Tooke (1736–1812), politician and philologist
Edward Gibbon, FRS (1737–1794), historian
William Cavendish-Bentinck, 3rd Duke of Portland (1738–1809), Prime Minister
Arthur Middleton (1742–1787), signatory of the United States Declaration of Independence
Charles Cotesworth Pinckney (1746–1825), ADC to Washington 1777, defeated by Jefferson in 1804 in contest for Presidency
Jeremy Bentham (1748–1832), philosopher, lawyer and eccentric
Archibald James Edward Stewart, 1st Baron Douglas of Douglas (1748–1827); winner of the Douglas Cause; MP and Lord Lieutenant of Forfarshire
Edward Hussey (1749–1816), cricketer, sportsman and owner of Scotney Castle in Kent
Henry William Bunbury (1750–1811), caricaturist
Thomas Pinckney (1750–1828), American ambassador to Britain
James Bland Burgess (1752–1824), dramatist and playwright
Richard Burke Jr. (1758–1794), Member of Parliament
Thomas Bruce, 7th Earl of Elgin (1766–1841), ambassador to Constantinople, bringer of parthenon marbles to Britain
Henry William Paget, 1st Marquess of Anglesey (1768–1854), cavalry and horse artillery officer at Waterloo, where he lost a leg
James Bruce (1769–1798), Member of Parliament
Sir Francis Burdett, 5th Baronet (1770–1844), radical parliamentarian and parliamentary reformer
Robert Southey (1774–1843), Poet Laureate 1813
Matthew Lewis (1775–1818), dramatist
Benjamin Hall (1778–1817), Welsh industrialist, father of 1st Baron Llanover (below)
Henry Fynes Clinton (1781–1852), scholar
John Hobhouse, 1st Baron Broughton (1786–1869), companion and ally of Byron
Charles Robert Cockerell (1788–1863), architect, archaeologist, and writer
FitzRoy Somerset, 1st Baron Raglan (1788–1855), lost his right arm at Waterloo, C-in-C in the Crimea
Sir James Graham (1792–1861), politician
John Russell, 1st Earl Russell (1792–1878), Prime Minister
Henry Westenra, 3rd Baron Rossmore (1792–1860), politician and piper
Charles Longley (1794–1868), Archbishop of Canterbury
William Mure (1799–1860), scholar and politician

19th century
John Nelson Darby (1800–1882), Irish clergyman
Thomas Henry Lister (1800–1842), novelist and first Registrar General
Benjamin Hall, 1st Baron Llanover (1802–1867), Commissioner of Works and Public Buildings responsible for, amongst others, the current Palace of Westminster, likely to have given his name to Big Ben
Augustus Short (1802–1883), the first Anglican bishop of Adelaide, South Australia
Zerah Colburn (1804–1840), Canadian child mathematics prodigy
Sir Robert Joseph Phillimore (1810–1885), Judge of the Arches
Gilbert Abbott à Beckett (1811–1856), writer
Sir Charles Dilke, 1st Baronet (1811–1869), reformer, instigator of the Great Exhibition
Henry Mayhew (1812–1887), reforming and satirical journalist; chronicler of London's poor and founder of Punch
Sir George Webbe Dasent (1817–1896), author
Sir Edward Poynter (1836–1919), painter
Richard Grosvenor, 1st Baron Stalbridge (1837–1912), Liberal politician
Sir Roland Vaughan Williams (1838–1916), Lord Justice of Appeal
Henry Bull (1843–1905), cricketer
Sir Charles Dilke, 2nd Baronet (1843–1911), Liberal and Radical statesman
Arthur Lee (1849–1925), cricketer
Herbert Rawson (1852–1924), England footballer
Norman Bailey (1857–1923), England footballer
Oswell Borradaile (1859–1935), cricketer and cricket administrator
F. W. Bain (1863–1940), writer of fantasy stories
Percy Dearmer (1867–1936), radical clergyman and liturgist
Edward Henry Blakeney (1869–1955), poet and classical scholar
 Harry Robert Kempe (1852-1935), electrical engineer, author and editor
Frederick Ranalow (1873–1953), baritone and actor
Sir Guy Francis Laking (1875–1919), art historian and Keeper of the London Museum
Charles Dennis Fisher (1877–1916), classical scholar
Sir K. A. C. Creswell (1879–1974), architectural historian specialising in Egyptian Islamic architecture
Jasper Blaxland (1880–1963), consultant surgeon
Hugh Bompas (1881–1944), first-class cricketer, barrister, First World War aviator and civil servant
A. A. Milne (1882–1956), author and journalist
Hussein Ala (1882–1964), Prime Minister of Iran
Battiscombe Gunn (1883–1950), Egyptologist
Adrian Stephen (1883–1948), Bloomsbury psychoanalyst
Henry Tizard (1885–1959), scientist and inventor
Harry St. John Philby (1885–1960), Arabist, explorer, author, agent
John Spedan Lewis (1885–1963), founder of employee-owned John Lewis Partnership
Reginald Hackforth (1887–1957), Classical scholar, professor of Ancient Philosophy at Cambridge University
John Colin Campbell, 1st Viscount Davidson (1889–1970), Conservative politician
Gustav Hamel (1889–1914), pioneer aviator
Sir Adrian Boult (1889–1984), conductor
Edgar Adrian (1889–1977), scientist and Nobel Prizewinner
Jack Hulbert (1892–1978), actor
Oliver Lyttelton, 1st Viscount Chandos (1893–1972), Cabinet Minister during World War II, chairman of the National Theatre Board
Frederick Melville (1882–1940), philatelist
Guy Chapman, OBE MC (1889–1972), historian
Meredith Frampton (1894–1984), artist
Geoffrey Bailey (1899after 1929), World War I flying ace
Leslie Woodgate (19001961), choral conductor, composer and writer

20th century
R.A. Bevan (1901–1974), media pioneer
Robert Rattenbury (1901–1970), classical scholar and Registrary of the University of Cambridge
Gregory Dix (1902–1952), liturgical scholar
C. W. A. Scott (1903–1946), pioneer aviator
Patrick Hamilton (1904–1962), novelist and playwright
Sir John Gielgud (1904–2000), actor and director
Sir John Aitken (1910–1985), Conservative newspaper owner
H. A. R. "Kim" Philby (1912–1988), agent who defected to USSR 1963
Professor Sir Richard Doll, CH FRS (1912–2005), epidemiologist
Pierre Turquet (1913–1975), psychiatrist and Olympic fencer
Sir Richard Stone (1913–1991), Nobel Prize winner
Angus Wilson (1913–1991), novelist
Norman Parkinson (1913–1990), photographer
Sir William Deakin (1913–2005), historian and literary assistant to Winston Churchill
John Freeman (born 1915), Labour politician, broadcaster, diplomat and television chairman
Jack Simmons (1915–2000), historian
Henry Young  (1915–1943), RAF pilot who took part in Dambusters raid
Sir Andrew Huxley FRS (1917–2012), scientist
Cecil Gould (1918–1994), art historian
Brian Urquhart (born 1919), UN undersecretary-general and pioneer of peacekeeping
Sir Peter Ustinov (1921–2004), actor, writer and director
Michael Flanders and Donald Swann (1922–1975 and 1923–1994), performers, writers and musicians
Neville Sandelson (1923–2002), founder member of the Social Democratic Party
Michael Havers (1923–1992), lord chancellor
Richard Wollheim (1923–2003), philosopher
Michael Hamburger (1924–2007), translator, poet and literary critic
Colin Turnbull (1924–1994), anthropologist
Tony Benn (1925–2014), politician
Peter Brook (born 1925), theatre director
Tristram Cary (born 1925), pioneering composer
Anthony Sampson (1926–2004), author, founder member of the Social Democratic Party
Edward Enfield (born 1929), broadcaster
Donald Allchin (1930–2010), theologian
Sir Crispin Tickell (born 1930), environmentalist, diplomat and academic
Nigel, Lord Lawson (born 1932), former Conservative Chancellor of the Exchequer
Anthony Howard (born 1934), journalist
Sir Roger Norrington (born 1934), musician
Metropolitan Kallistos (Ware) (born 1934), Orthodox theologian
Simon Gray (1936–2008), playwright
John Goldman (1938–2013), medical scientist
William Cookson (1939–2004), literary critic
Adam Roberts (born 1939), academic
Jonathan Fenby (born 1942), journalist, writer and former editor of The Observer and the South China Morning Post
Julian, Lord Hunt (born 1942), climate change writer and Labour peer
Sir Peter Bottomley (born 1944), Conservative politician
Robin Gill (born 1944), ethicist
Peter Asher (born 1944), musician
Maqbool Rahimtoola (born 1945), Pakistani minister of commerce
Gordon Waller (1945–2009), musician
Paul Atterbury (born 1945), broadcaster
David Carpenter (born 1947), historian
William, Baron Bach (born 1946), Labour politician
Martyn Poliakoff (born 1947), scientist
David Neuberger, Baron Neuberger of Abbotsbury (born 1948), President of the Supreme Court
Andrew, Lord Lloyd-Webber (born 1948), musician 
Michael Attenborough (born 1950), theatre director
Henry Marsh (born 1950), neuro-surgeon and author
Jacek Rostowski (born 1951), Polish cabinet minister
Tim Sebastian (born 1952), television correspondent and interviewer
Stephen Poliakoff (born 1952), playwright
Philip Carr-Gomm (born 1952), druid and author 
Nigel Planer (born 1953), novelist and actor
Chris Huhne (born 1954), Liberal Democrat politician
Adam Mars-Jones (born 1954), novelist and critic
Patrick Wintour (born 1954), journalist<ref>'Wintour, Patrick (born 1 Nov. 1954)' in Who's Who 2011 (London: A. & C. Black, 2011)</ref>
Christopher Catherwood (born 1955), author
James Robbins (born 1955), diplomatic correspondent
Tim Gardam (born 1955), journalist and educator, former director of Channel 4
Andrew Graham-Dixon (born 1956), broadcaster and art historian
Dominic Grieve (born 1956), former Attorney-General and pro-European politician
Dominic Lawson (born 1956), journalist
Nicholas Hamblen, Lord Hamblen (born 1957), Justice of the Supreme Court
Shane MacGowan (born 1957), musician
James Lasdun (born 1957), poet and novelist
Thomas Dolby (born 1958), musician
Louisa Young (born 1959), author
Edward St Aubyn (born 1960), author
Tom Holt (born 1960), novelist
Timothy Winter (born 1960), Islamic scholar
Michael Reiss (born 1960), Anglican bioethicist
George Benjamin (born 1960), composer
Daisy Goodwin (born 1961), television producer, poetry anthologist and novelist 
David Heyman (born 1961), film producer
Tessa Ross (born 1961), National Theatre director
Imogen Stubbs (born 1961), actress
John Kampfner (born 1962), arts director and journalist
Simon Target (born 1962), documentary filmmaker 
Geoff Mulgan (born 1962), academic, former adviser to Gordon Brown and Tony Blair 
Chris Nineham (born 1962), antiwar activist, founder of anti-Iraq war protest
Bronwen Maddox (born 1963), journalist, writer, director of the Institute for Government
Alexander Beard (born 1963), arts administrator
Matt Frei (born 1963), foreign correspondent
Ian Bostridge (born 1964), tenor
Richard Rutnagur (born 1964), sportsman
Michael Sherwood (born 1965), banker
Lucasta Miller (born 1966), literary critic
Helena Bonham Carter (born 1966), actress
Julian Anderson (born 1967), composer
Nick Clegg (born 1967), British Deputy Prime Minister and Liberal Democrat leader
Noreena Hertz (born 1967), economist and campaigner
Jason Kouchak (born 1967), musician and composer
Gavin Rossdale (born 1967), musician and actor
Alexander Williams (born 1967), artist and animator
Richard Harris (born 1968), composer and pianist
Ruth Kelly MP (born 1968), former Education Secretary
Adam Buxton and Joe Cornish (born 1968 and 1969), TV performers and journalists
Giles Coren (born 1969), journalist
Marcel Theroux (born 1969), novelist
Louis Theroux (born 1970), broadcaster
Tobias Hill (born 1970), poet and novelist
Jonathan Yeo (born 1970), artist
Dido Armstrong (born 1971), musician under the name of "Dido"
Jamie McCartney (born 1971), artist and sculptor
Polly Arnold (born 1972), scientist
Martha Lane Fox (born 1973), public servant, dot.com entrepreneur and philanthropist
James Reynolds (born 1974), BBC Rome Correspondent
Mike Sergeant, (born 1975),  BBC foreign correspondent
Helen Whately (born 1976),  politician
Conrad Shawcross (born 1977), artist
Christian Coulson (born 1978), actor
Pinny Grylls (born 1978), filmmaker
Benjamin Yeoh (born 1978), playwright
Alexander Shelley (born 1979), conductor
Jenny Kleeman (born c. 1980), documentary film-maker, journalist and reporter/presenter of Unreported World''
Clemency Burton (born 1981), novelist and broadcaster
Alastair Sooke (born 1981), art historian and broadcaster
Alice Eve (born 1982), actress
Nick Douwma (born 1982), musician - DJ under the name "Sub Focus"
Mica Penniman (born 1983), musician under the name "Mika"
Anna Stothard (born 1983), novelist 
Tamsin Omond (born 1984), environmental campaigner
Alexander Campkin (born 1984), conductor and composer
Grace Chatto (born 1985), musician
Sophie Troiano and Marcus Mepstead (born 1987 and 1990), Olympic sportspeople
Alfred Enoch (born 1988), actor
Alexander Guttenplan (born 1990), captain of winning University Challenge team 2010
Jack Aitken (born 1995), racing driver
Blondey McCoy (born 1997),  artist and fashion designer

Footnotes

 
Westminster
Adhritt Seth